Cakile edentula, the American searocket, is a species of the flowering Cakile plant. This plant is native to North America.

Distribution
Cakile edentula  is most commonly found on the beaches and dunes of North America. More commonly, it is found on the East coast of the United States. American sea-rocket is most likely to be found in areas along the coastline. This plant is not a wetland plant, but can occasionally be found in wetland environments. It is also a non-native, invasive species in other parts of the world, especially Japan and Australia.

Habitat and ecology
Cakile edentula grows on the dunes of coastal beaches, as well as shorelines of freshwater lakes. Well drained, sandy soil is preferred.  It is likely to be found in areas midway up beaches, out of the range of waves and tides, which can destroy individuals, especially through storm events. Cakile edentula has the life cycle of an annual plant in Northern latitudes. In warmer climates, it survives as a biennial if possible.
Cakile edentula  grows roots more aggressively and intensively if a nearby competitor is sensed. The plant does not react this way if the nearby competitor is kin.

Description
Individuals of this species are succulent plants with thick leaves. This plant grows as a short shrub on beaches. Leaves, one per node, alternately grow on the stem. These leaves have various teeth and lobe patterns.

Flowers and fruit

Flowers are separate, radially symmetrical, and contain four petals. These flowers can be pink to red, blue to purple, or white. Fruit are small and green, about 1–2 centimeters in diameter. These fruit are dry and do not split open when ripe. Fruit are released at the end of each growing season.

Uses 
The leaves are edible, preferably cooked, and not eaten in great quantity.

References

External links
 Plants Profile for Cakile edentula (American searocket). United States Department of Agriculture.

Brassicaceae
Leaf vegetables